Głobikówka  is a village in the administrative district of Gmina Brzostek, within Dębica County, Subcarpathian Voivodeship, in south-eastern Poland.

The village has a population of 230.

References

Villages in Dębica County